Donnie Brooks (born John Dee Abohosh; February 6, 1936 – February 23, 2007) was an American pop music singer. Brooks is a member of the Rockabilly Hall of Fame.

Early life
Born in Dallas, Texas, Abohosh moved to Ventura, California in his teens, where he was adopted by his stepfather and took the name John D. Faircloth. He discovered a singing voice at a young age and recorded a few minor hits with several small record labels under the stage names Johnny Jordan, Dick Bush (which sole single "Hollywood Party" was his first for Era), and Johnny Faire, the latter gaining some sales with "Bertha Lou" in early 1959, while a cover version by Clint Miller charted nationally.

Success
In 1958, on Vine Street north of Hollywood Boulevard, across the street from the Capitol Records building and above the Ontra Cafeteria, were the offices of Hal Zeiger – World Wide Attractions, which produced The Borscht Capades starring Mickey Katz (father of Joel Grey) and several Southern California rock and roll concert venues, including Saturday Night at The El Monte Legion Stadium.
(The previous assortment of phrases could use a verb or two. )
Also in the complex was the Johnny Otis (Willie & The Hand Jive) recording studio, the offices of Eldo Records and the office of promoter Red "The Old Red Cat" Gilson. A late morning, midweek meeting was held by Gilson and a woman, Linda Stewart, who identified herself as representing a remarkable singer and showman named Donnie Brooks. Gilson was persuaded to "give the kid a shot" at the next El Monte Legion Stadium show. That Saturday, Brooks was introduced and sang two numbers, including Ray Charles' hit "What'd I Say". His performance was ultrahigh energy rarely seen by the Legion audience that stood filling the arena from the back wall to the edge of the five-foot-high stage. It was exciting, but because he didn't have a record being played on the radio, that may have been his only Legion appearance that year.
Encouraged by friends Dorsey and Johnny Burnette, he persevered in the music business; and in late 1959, he made his first recording using the name Donnie Brooks. Called "Li'l Sweetheart", it received a lukewarm reception, but his March 1960 hit single, "Mission Bell" on Era Records demonstrated a quality voice in an upbeat song that peaked at No. 7 on the Billboard Hot 100 chart.
His follow-up, "Doll House"/"Round Robin" (a double-sided hit single with a color picture sleeve on Era Records) peaked at No. 31 in December 1960. According to a 2006 concert at Sherman Indian High School, Riverside, California, posted on YouTube, Brooks revealed that he was the voice of the opening theme to the cartoon series George of the Jungle. He also sang the theme to the cartoon series Super Chicken and Tom Slick. In addition to Mission Bell, Brooks produced Merrilee Rush (Angel of the Morning), Cannibal + the Headhunters (Land of 1000 Dances), Len Barry (1-2-3, Bristol Stomp, You Can't Sit Down), Jewel Akens (Birds + Bees). All still appear on the Capehart Music Treasury vis downloads CDs, and DVDs.

Decline
Although he continued to record through the 1970s, he never again achieved the same level of success. In 1971, Brooks played the role of Christ in the rock opera Truth of Truths for Oak Records. The record was produced by Ray Ruff, who previously worked for ABC-Paramount, Happy Tiger and Dot. Brooks toured with other performers from the early rock and roll era in oldies revival shows.

Brooks had five children, Tony, Steve, Cathy, Saji, and Shad. All are still living.

Death
Brooks died of a heart attack following a long illness on February 23, 2007. He was 71.

There was a special memorial service and rockabilly show in his honor on Sunday, March 26, 2007, at the Elks Lodge in Burbank, California.

References

External links
Rockabilly Hall of Fame
Partial discography and audio samples

1936 births
2007 deaths
American male pop singers
People from Dallas
American rockabilly musicians
Challenge Records artists
Era Records artists
20th-century American singers
Country musicians from Texas
20th-century American male singers